Viola of Teschen, later known as Viola Elizabeth (ca. 1291 – 21 September 1317), was Queen of Bohemia and Poland by marriage to Wenceslaus III of Bohemia.

She was daughter of Mieszko I, Duke of Cieszyn, by his unknown wife. She was named after her paternal great-grandmother Viola, wife of Duke Casimir I of Opole.

Life

Queen of Bohemia and Poland
Viola married with young King Wenceslaus III of Bohemia and Poland on 5 October 1305 in Brno. The reasons for marriage are not too obvious: although later chroniclers describe how beautiful Viola was, her father Duke Mieszko I was only one of the vassals of King Wenceslaus III, and in consequence, this was an unequal union. The main reason wasn't her beauty but maybe the strategic position of Cieszyn between the Kingdoms of Bohemia and Poland. Four days after the wedding (9 October), Wenceslaus III annulled his long-time engagement to Elizabeth, daughter of King Andrew III of Hungary and with this renounced to all his claims over the Hungarian crown.

After her marriage, Viola took the name Elizabeth, but her union with the King wasn't completely happy because her husband's free lifestyle and the strong opposition of the Bohemian nobility, who had to prevent this "lower" union. Ten months later, on 4 August 1306, King Wenceslaus III was murdered in Olomouc under mysterious circumstances, leaving Viola as a fifteen-year-old widow. Maybe because of their youth, the union failed to produce an heir.

With little money and nowhere to go, Viola probably stayed with her sisters-in-law, Anna and Elisabeth in one of the nunneries. Both princesses were fighting for the throne of Bohemia, but Viola stayed away. Later, she mainly resided in Moravia, where she had her dowry towns.

Second Marriage. Death
After the arrest of Henry of Lipá, the now Queen Elisabeth of Bohemia and her husband John of Luxembourg tried to gain to their side the powerful nobleman Peter I of Rosenberg (Petr I. z Rožmberka), who at that time was engaged with Henry of Lipá's daughter. Soon Peter I of Rosenberg cancelled his betrothal and entered in an alliance with the Bohemian King and Queen; in order to reinforce his bonds with his new ally, King John gave him the hand of the Dowager Queen Viola. The marriage took place in 1316 but was childless and short-lived: Viola died only one year after, on 21 September 1317, and was buried in the vault of the House of Rosenberg in the Vyšší Brod Monastery.

Notes

References
Józef Golec, Stefania Bojda: Słownik biograficzny ziemi cieszyńskiej, vol. 1, Cieszyn 1993, p. 91.
Kazimierz Jasiński: Rodowód Piastów śląskich, vol. 3, Wrocław 1977.
Idzi Panic: Poczet Piastów i Piastówien cieszyńskich, Cieszyn [s.a.], p. 8.

|-

|-

|-

1290s births
1317 deaths
Piast dynasty
Bohemian queens consort
Hungarian queens consort
Polish queens consort
Remarried royal consorts
13th-century Bohemian people
13th-century Bohemian women
13th-century Polish people
13th-century Polish women
13th-century Hungarian people
13th-century Hungarian women
14th-century Bohemian people
14th-century Bohemian women
14th-century Polish people
14th-century Polish women
14th-century Hungarian people
14th-century Hungarian women